Seppe Baetens (born ) is a Belgian male volleyball player. He is currently part of the Belgium men's national volleyball team. On club level he plays for Axis Shanks Guibertin.

References

External links
 profile at FIVB.org

1989 births
Living people
Belgian men's volleyball players
Place of birth missing (living people)